Word Gets Around is the debut studio album by Welsh rock band Stereophonics. It was released on 25 August 1997 through V2 Records and reached number six in the UK Albums Chart, making it one of three Stereophonics albums not to reach number one; the other two being 2009's Keep Calm and Carry On, which reached number eleven, and 2013's Graffiti on the Train, which went to number three. Much of the album is written about everyday life in Cwmaman, the band's hometown. The deluxe and super-deluxe editions were released on 18 October 2010. The name of the album comes from lyrics in the album's last song, "Billy Davey's Daughter".

Track listing

Re-release
On 24 August 2010, Stereophonics announced on their website that Word Gets Around, along with Performance and Cocktails, were to be re-released. To accompany the re-releases, Stereophonics performed all the songs off both the albums at the Hammersmith Apollo on 17 and 18 October 2010. They were released on 18 October 2010 and were made into two forms:

Track listing
Deluxe:  The original album on one disc and a bonus CD featuring 12 b-sides and rare tracks.

Super deluxe: The album on one disc (as listed above) and two bonus CDs (one with 15 b-sides and the other includes 10 rare tracks), artcards and a replica of Kelly Jones' notebook.

Personnel

Stereophonics
Stuart Cable – drums
Kelly Jones – vocals, guitars
Richard Jones – bass

Additional
Marshall Bird – keyboards
Nadia Lannman – cello on "Billy Davey's Daughter"
Richard Payne – accordion on "Not Up to You"

Technical
Bird & Bush – producer, engineer, mixing
Bob Ludwig – mastering
Lee Dunn – artwork, design
Emma Jones - studio assistant

Charts

Weekly charts

Year-end charts

Certifications

References
Footnotes

Bibliography

External links
Word Gets Around at Stereophonics.com

Stereophonics albums
1997 debut albums
V2 Records albums